is a city located in Gifu, Japan. , the city had an estimated population of 34,453 in 12, 464 households, and a population density of 390 persons per km2.

Geography
Motosu is located in western Gifu Prefecture.

Climate
The city has a climate characterized by characterized by hot and humid summers, and mild winters (Köppen climate classification Cfa).

Neighbouring municipalities
Gifu Prefecture
Gifu
Seki
Yamagata
Mizuho
Ibigawa
Ōno
Kitagata
Fukui Prefecture
Ōno

Demographics
Per Japanese census data, the population of Motosu peaked around 2010 and has declined since.

City symbols
Motosu city's tree is the persimmon tree, which is found growing naturally in the mountainous areas of Motosu. As persimmons are also cultivated in Motosu, it was chosen to represent the agricultural industry in the area.

The city flower is the usuzumi cherry blossom found in the recently merged Neo. This unique cherry blossom initially sprouts pale pink flowers, which become white in full bloom, and a light black colour when the flowers die. Neo is also home to one of the three largest cherry blossom trees in Japan, which is reported to be the oldest cherry blossom tree in Japan.

Ayu or sweetfish, has been chosen to be the representative fish of the city. Known as "the queen of clear streams", the fish is found in the Neo River that flows through Motosu. Highly regarded for its flavour in Japan, it is fished throughout summer in the rivers.

The Motosu city bird is the uguisu or Japanese bush warbler, found in shrub thickets throughout Motosu. The bush warbler is known for its greenish brown colouring on its back, and white belly. Female birds can also be recognised by their dash pattern on their backs. It is also known as the "flower-viewing" bird, for its appearance near the many cherry blossom trees in the area.

In order to commemorate the three-year anniversary Motosu-city's amalgamation of Itonuki, Neo, Shinsei and Motosu, the municipal government began working on a theme song that best represented their vision of the future. The lyrics of the theme song, "Habataite", are intended to convey the ideas of nature and people living harmoniously together. The song is played every afternoon on the loudspeakers to warn children to return home before nightfall. The music was written by the world-renowned ocarina player Soujirou, who was commissioned by the local city government to write the theme song.

History
The area around Motosu was part of traditional Mino Province.  During the Edo period, much of the area was under the  control of Ogaki Domain under the Tokugawa shogunate.  In the post-Meiji restoration cadastral reforms, Motosu District in Gifu Prefecture was created.

On October 28, 1891, the Mino–Owari earthquake, the second largest earthquake to hit Japan, struck. Its epicenter was located in Motosu.

The modern city of Motosu was established on February 1, 2004, from the merger of the former town of Motosu, absorbing the towns of Itonuki and Shinsei, and the village of Neo (all from Motosu District).

Government
Motosu has a mayor-council form of government with a directly elected mayor and a unicameral city legislature of 16 members.

Economy
On April 29, 2006, Malera Gifu opened on Mitsuhashi, one of the main roads of Motosu. This shopping centre covers an area of 185,000 m2, making it one of the largest shopping centres in Japan. It houses approximately 240 retail outlets, including a supermarket (Valor), restaurants, clothes retailers and a cinema (Toho Cinema).

Education

Colleges and universities
National Institute of Technology, Gifu College

Primary and secondary education
Motosu has eight public elementary schools and four public middle schools operated by the city government. The city has one public high school operated by the Gifu Prefectural Board of Education, and one private high school (Gifu Daiichi High School).

Transportation

Railway
 Tarumi Railway Tarumi Line
   -  -  -  -  -  - <> -  - <> -  -   -  -  -

Highway

References

External links

Motosu City official website 
Malera official website 

 
Cities in Gifu Prefecture